Yuri Bazilevs is the E. Paul Sorensen Chair at the Brown University School of Engineering. His research is highly cited. Before coming to Brown in 2018, Bazilevs taught at the University of California, San Diego's Jacobs School of Engineering.

Bazilevs earned his bachelor's and master's degree from Rensselaer Polytechnic Institute and his doctorate from the University of Texas at Austin.

Honors and awards 

 American Society of Mechanical Engineers Materials Division Centennial Mid-Career Award, 2021
 Walter L. Huber Civil Engineering Research Prize, 2018
 Thomas J.R. Hughes Young Investigator Award, 2012
 Fellow, United States Association for Computational Mechanics, 2015

References

External links 

 

Rensselaer Polytechnic Institute alumni
University of Texas at Austin alumni
Brown University faculty
21st-century American engineers
Year of birth missing (living people)
Living people